The 2012 Indian Federation Cup was the 34th season of the top knock-out competition in India. The qualifiers started in August while the Final Round took place from 19 September 2012 to 30 September 2012.

Salgaocar were the defending champions, having beaten East Bengal 3–1 in the 2011 Final.

DD Sports Friday agreed to telecast live the semifinals and final of the tournament.

The cup was eventually won by East Bengal after they defeated Dempo in the final on 30 September 2012.

Teams

Calendar
The calendar for the 2012 Indian Federation Cup, as announced by the All India Football Federation:

Qualifying rounds

All of the teams entering the competition that are not members of the I-League and have to compete in the qualifying rounds.

Group stage

Group A

Group B

Group C

Group D

Semi-finals

Final

Goalscorers
5 goals:
 Chidi Edeh (East Bengal)

4 goals:

 Manandeep Singh (East Bengal)
 Koko Sakibo (Dempo)

3 goals:

 Anthony D'Souza (Salgaocar)
 Akram Moghrabi (Churchill Brothers)
 Clifford Miranda (Dempo)
 Christopher Chizoba (Kalighat MS)
 Katsumi Yusa (ONGC)
 David Opara (Mumbai)

2 goals:

 Beto (Churchill Brothers)
 Mohammed Rafique (Prayag United)
 James Gbilee (Kalighat MS)
 Henry Antchouet (Churchill Brothers)
 Mackroy Peixote (Sporting Goa)
 David Sunday (Mohammedan)
 Holicharan Narzary (Pailan Arrows)
 Dawson Fernandes (Sporting Goa)
 Oneyama Eke (ONGC)

1 goal:

 Luciano Sabrosa (Salgaocar)
 Bikramjit Singh (Churchill Brothers)
 Climax Lawrence (Dempo)
 Tanmoy Kundu (Kalighat MS)
 Chinadorai Sabeeth (Mohun Bagan)
 Lalmuanpuia (ONGC)
 Prabir Das (Pailan Arrows)
 Nicholas Colaco (Salgaocar)
 Johnny Menyongar (Shillong Lajong)
 Gbeneme Friday (Shillong Lajong)
 Carlos Hernández (Prayag United)
 Joaquim Abranches (Dempo)
 Lalrindika Ralte (East Bengal)
 Mohammed Mukhtar (Mohammedan)
 Sachin Gawas (ONGC)
 Dhanpal Ganeshan (Pailan Arrows)
 Jeje Lalpekhlua (Pune)
 Victorino Fernandes (Sporting Goa)
 Junior Obagbemiro (Air India)
 Ebi Sukore (Shillong Lajong)
 Bineesh Balan (Churchill Brothers)
 Mahesh Gawli (Dempo)
 Arnab Mondal (East Bengal)
 Manish Mathani (Mohan Bagan)
 Tarif Ahmed (ONGC)
 Deepak Devrani (Pailan Arrows)
 Arata Izumi (Pune)
 Pierre Djidjia Douhou (Pune)
 Henry Ezeh (Air India)
 Ángel Guirado (Salgaocar)

References

External links
 The Indian Federation Cup at the-aiff.com

 
2012-13
India
Federation Cup